Aik Aur Munafiq is a Pakistani anthology series, premiered on 28 October 2020 on Geo Entertainment. It is Created by Abdullah Kadwani and Asad Qureshi under 7th Sky Entertainment.It is a series of standalone episodes highlighting the element of hypocrisy that prevails in the relationships.

Cast
Hina Altaf as Mahapara 
Azfar Rehman
Haris Waheed as Wajid 
Asma Abbas as Begum Sahiba 
Mizna Waqas 
Syed Jibran
Rabia Noreen as Tahira
Haroon Shahid
Beena Chaudhary as Amna
Amar Khan as Hamna
Ayesha Gul as Ghazala
Kamran Jilani as Wahab
Samina Ahmed as Dadi
Aagha Ali as Rashid
Areeba Habib as Atifa

Episodes

References

External links 
 Aik Aur Munafiq-Harpal Geo

2020 Pakistani television series debuts
Pakistani drama television series
Urdu-language television shows
Pakistani anthology television series